In machine learning, the hinge loss is a loss function used for training classifiers. The hinge loss is used for "maximum-margin" classification, most notably for support vector machines (SVMs).

For an intended output  and a classifier score , the hinge loss of the prediction  is defined as

Note that  should be the "raw" output of the classifier's decision function, not the predicted class label.

Extensions
While binary SVMs are commonly extended to multiclass classification in a one-vs.-all or one-vs.-one fashion,
it is also possible to extend the hinge loss itself for such an end. Several different variations of multiclass hinge loss have been proposed. For example, Crammer and Singer
defined it for a linear classifier as

Weston and Watkins provided a similar definition, but with a sum rather than a max:

In structured prediction, the hinge loss can be further extended to structured output spaces. Structured SVMs with margin rescaling use the following variant, where  denotes the SVM's parameters,  the SVM's predictions,  the joint feature function, and  the Hamming loss:

Optimization
The hinge loss is a convex function, so many of the usual convex optimizers used in machine learning can work with it. It is not differentiable, but has a subgradient with respect to model parameters  of a linear SVM with score function  that is given by

or the quadratically smoothed

suggested by Zhang.

See also

References 

Loss functions
Support vector machines